Qareh Kelisa (also Romanized as Qareh Kelīsā and Qarah Kalīsā) is a village in Baba Jik Rural District, in the Central District of Chaldoran County, West Azerbaijan Province, Iran. At the 2006 census, its population was 174, in 32 families, all Azerbaijanis.

References 

Populated places in Chaldoran County